†Gastrocopta ogasawarana was a species of very small air-breathing land snail, a terrestrial pulmonate gastropod mollusk in the family Vertiginidae, the whorl snails. This small snail was endemic to Japan; it is now extinct.

References
.

Vertiginidae
Extinct gastropods
Extinct animals of Japan
Taxonomy articles created by Polbot